The towpath murders was a case in which two teenage girls were murdered on the towpath near Teddington Lock in Richmond upon Thames, London, England, on 31 May 1953. Alfred Charles Whiteway (1931 – 22 December 1953) was found guilty and hanged for the murders, which attracted much press attention, the case being described at the time as "one of Scotland Yard's most notable triumphs in a century". 

At the trial, defence counsel Peter Rawlinson had subjected lead detective Herbert Hannam to what was at the time considered a very sharp cross-examination on Whiteway's contention that the main evidence against him had been manufactured by police.

Victims
The victims were 16-year-old Barbara Songhurst and 18-year-old Christine Reed. The girls had been on a bicycle trip on Sunday, 31 May 1953, and were seen cycling along the towpath beside the River Thames at about 11pm. They failed to return home. Songhurst's body was found the next day floating in the river, and Reed's body was found on 6 June, after a section of the river was drained. Pathologist Keith Mant determined that both victims had been beaten, raped and killed with a hatchet.

Investigation
Alfred Charles Whiteway, aged 22, separated from his wife and living with his parents in Sydney Road, Teddington, was arrested a month later after the two separate rapes of women in Surrey. At first Whiteway denied any involvement. Later, a police constable found an axe under the back seat of a police car, apparently hidden by Whiteway following his arrest for the rape of a 14-year-old girl and an attack on a woman in the Oxshott Heath and Woods. The axe was found at the house of the constable, who had taken it home and was using it to chop wood. 

Forensic tests of the time could only inconclusively link traces of blood on the axe and Whiteway's shoes to the murders, but his signature to what police said was a confession taken down by them was crucial evidence for the prosecution. However, Whiteway continuously insisted he had been told to sign at the bottom of a blank sheet of paper and police had simply manufactured the confession.

Trial
Whiteway was tried at the Old Bailey in the autumn 1953 before Mr Justice Hilbery. He was defended by solicitor Arthur Prothero, who instructed Peter Rawlinson, then a relatively junior barrister. Rawlinson cross-examined murder squad detective Herbert Hannam at length, opening large holes in his evidence of the confession, which Whiteway claimed was falsified.

Press reports of the period complained at the implication that the police were lying. In view of police methods of the time, and Hannam's book expressing the opinion that the law sometimes must be ignored by detectives, subsequent commentary has thought it not unlikely that Whiteway had been "verbaled".

On 2 November, after forty-five minutes of deliberation, the jury found Whiteway guilty. An appeal was heard by the Lord Chief Justice (Lord Goddard), Mr. Justice Sellers and Mr. Justice Barry but was rejected on 7 December. Whiteway was hanged at Wandsworth Prison on 22 December 1953. The axe is in the Black Museum at Scotland Yard.

References

1953 murders in the United Kingdom
1953 in London
Murder in London
History of the London Borough of Richmond upon Thames
May 1953 events in the United Kingdom
Female murder victims
Axe murder
Violence against women in London
1950s murders in London